Things to Do in Denver When You're Dead is a 1995 American crime film directed by Gary Fleder and written by Scott Rosenberg. The film features an ensemble cast that includes Andy García, Christopher Lloyd, Treat Williams, Steve Buscemi, Christopher Walken, Fairuza Balk and Gabrielle Anwar.

The film's title comes from a Warren Zevon song of the same name, recorded on his 1991 album Mr. Bad Example, which he allowed under the condition that the song be played during the end credits.  The lead character's name, "Jimmy the Saint," comes from the Bruce Springsteen song "Lost in the Flood" from his 1973 album Greetings from Asbury Park, N.J. The film was screened in the Un Certain Regard section at the 1995 Cannes Film Festival.

The film was a box office bomb and received negative reviews from critics, with many dismissing it as a "Pulp Fiction clone".

Plot
Trying to go straight, ex-gangster Jimmy "The Saint" Tosnia runs Afterlife Advice in Denver, where dying people videotape messages for their loved ones. His business isn't doing well and his former boss, a local crime lord known as "The Man With The Plan," has bought up his debt in order to command a favor involving the crime lord's son, Bernard, who has been arrested for child molestation. The Man With The Plan, who was left a quadriplegic after an attempt on his life, wants Jimmy to persuade Bernard's ex-girlfriend Meg to come back to him; The Man With the Plan believes this will cure Bernard of his pedophilia.

A reluctant Jimmy recruits his friends Easy Wind, Pieces, Big Bear Franchise and the rage-prone Critical Bill. The plan is to have Pieces and Critical Bill pose as police officers, intercept Meg's current boyfriend, Bruce, and intimidate him until he agrees to break up with Meg. Things go wrong when Bruce grows suspicious of the two men's identities and mocks them, whereupon Critical Bill stabs Bruce in the throat. The commotion wakes up Meg, sleeping in the back of Bruce's van. Meg's appearance startles Pieces, who accidentally shoots her dead. The Man With The Plan is furious at the outcome of their botched mission. He informs Jimmy that he will allow him to live, as long as he leaves Denver, but his crew have been sentenced to "buckwheats"  to be assassinated in a gruesome and painful manner.

Jimmy's friends come to terms with their impending deaths as they are stalked by a hit man, Mr. Shhh, who never fails. Pieces accepts his fate, with Mr. Shhh providing a quick death. Easy Wind goes into hiding with a gang lord called Baby Sinister, but is given up after Mr. Shhh infiltrates and kills most of Sinister's entourage. Because Franchise has a family to raise, Jimmy pleads with The Man With The Plan to spare his life. The Man With The Plan agrees to Jimmy's terms but betrays him anyway by having Franchise killed. The betrayal makes Jimmy vengeful; in turn, Jimmy is also sentenced to die.

Mr. Shhh finally locates Critical Bill holed up in his apartment, but is ambushed by Bill and the two end up killing each other. In the wake of Mr. Shhh's death, the contract on Jimmy falls to a trio of Mexican brothers. In his final hours, Jimmy says goodbye to a young woman he had fallen in love with, Dagney. Knowing that he will most likely be killed, Jimmy murders Bernard for all the misery he indirectly brought upon the group. He also impregnates Lucinda, a prostitute, in order to fulfill her wish of becoming a mother. In a pre-recorded Afterlife Advice video, Jimmy gives life advice to his unborn child. The trio of killers catches up to Jimmy and he takes his death gracefully. The Man With The Plan is seen mourning his son's death. Jimmy and his friends are then seen together having "boat drinks" in the afterlife.

Cast

Reception

Produced on a budget of $8 million, the film made under $530,000 upon its limited release.

On Rotten Tomatoes it has a rating of 34% based on reviews from 29 critics, with an average rating of 5.10/10. The site's critical consensus states, "Just watch a Tarantino movie instead—and buy a Warren Zevon record while you're at it." On Metacritic it has a score of 46% based on reviews from 16 critics, indicating "mixed or average reviews".

Roger Ebert of the Chicago Sun-Times wrote: "On balance, I think it's an interesting miss, but a movie you might enjoy if (a) you don't expect a masterpiece, and (b) you like the dialogue in Quentin Tarantino movies."

References

External links
 
 
 
 

1995 films
1990s crime comedy films
1995 crime thriller films
American neo-noir films
American crime comedy films
Films directed by Gary Fleder
Films about organized crime in the United States
Films scored by Michael Convertino
Films set in Colorado
Films shot in Colorado
Films with screenplays by Scott Rosenberg
Miramax films
1995 directorial debut films
1995 comedy films
1990s English-language films
1990s American films